The BL 14 inch 45 calibre gun were various similar naval guns designed and manufactured by Elswick Ordnance Company to equip ships that Armstrong-Whitworth built and/or armed for several countries before World War I.

History
When World War I began, Armstrong-Whitworth were building the battleship Almirante Latorre for Chile, armed with 10 of its 14-inch guns. The battleship was acquired by the British government and completed as HMS Canada and served in the Royal Navy in World War I, with its guns designated BL 14 inch Mk I.

After World War I the battleship was sold to Chile as Almirante Latorre as originally intended.

Railway guns

Elswick built several guns for Japan which went into British service as railway guns in World War I under the designation BL 14 inch Mk III. They were similar to but lighter than Mk I, and were modified to give similar performance as Mk I.

See also
List of naval guns

Weapons of comparable role, performance and era
14"/45 caliber gun US equivalent
Vickers 14 inch/45 naval gun Vickers/Japanese equivalent

Notes

References
Tony DiGiulian, British 14"/45 (35.6 cm) Marks I and III
I.V. Hogg & L.F. Thurston, British Artillery Weapons & Ammunition 1914-1918. London: Ian Allan, 1972.

External links

Naval guns of the United Kingdom
Naval weapons of Chile
356 mm artillery
Elswick Ordnance Company